The National Hockey League Players' Association (NHLPA) is the labour union for the group of professional hockey players who are under Standard Player Contracts to the 32 member clubs in the National Hockey League (NHL) located in the United States and Canada. The association represents its membership in all matters dealing with their working conditions and contractual rights as well as serving as their exclusive collective bargaining agent.

History

First organizing efforts (1957–1959) 

The first NHLPA was formed in 1957, led by Ted Lindsay of the Detroit Red Wings and Doug Harvey of the Montreal Canadiens, after the league had refused to release pension plan financial information. The owners sabotaged the certification of the union by, in part, trading players involved with the association or sending them to the minor leagues. After an out-of-court settlement over several players' issues, the players disbanded the organization. Lindsay's struggle and the NHL's union busting efforts are dramatized in the movie Net Worth.

Alan Eagleson era (1967–1991) 
The association formed in June 1967, when representatives of the six NHL teams met and elected Bob Pulford their first president and appointed Alan Eagleson as its executive director.

To prevent the new NHLPA from suffering the fate of its predecessor, Pulford met with the owners of the NHL teams and demanded they recognize the new union or the union would seek official recognition from Canadian Labour Relations Board. Additionally, the players sought guarantees that no member of the new union would be punished for being a member. The owners acceded. In return, the NHLPA agreed that it should represent at least two-thirds of the active players in the NHL and that the players would refrain from striking for the duration of the agreement, so long as the owners did not contravene any terms or conditions.

Bob Goodenow era (1992–2005) 
Eagleson stayed on until the end of 1991, when the players replaced him with Bob Goodenow. Eagleson went on to face criminal charges relating to his conduct during the time he worked at the NHLPA, and ultimately, on January 6, 1998, pleaded guilty in a Boston court to three counts of fraud, agreeing also to pay a fine of CA$1,000,000. The following day in Toronto, Eagleson pleaded guilty to another three counts of fraud and was sentenced to 18 months in jail.

Bob Goodenow would seek to restore respect and honour to the association during his successful 13 years of service to the players as executive director. He led all NHLPA members through the strike of 1992, which most notably gave players the rights to the marketing of their own images. In 1994–95, he was at the helm as the players endured a lockout, ensuring that a fair deal was reached. A decade later, in 2004–05, the owners locked out the players again, becoming the first professional sports league to cancel an entire season. Goodenow would depart following the lockout, notifying the players of his resignation in July 2005.

Ted Saskin era (2005–2007) 
As Goodenow stepped down, the members of the association turned to long-time NHLPA Senior Director Ted Saskin as his successor, drawing on his experience within the association.

The NHLPA Executive Board terminated the employment of Saskin as executive director and general counsel on May 10, 2007, following alleged acts of misconduct. Toronto employment lawyer Chris Paliare concluded Saskin and executive Ken Kim, beginning in September 2005 through January 2007, covertly accessed player email accounts.

Paul Kelly era (2007–2009) 
On June 28, 2007, the NHLPA's executive board selected Michael Cammalleri (Calgary Flames), Chris Chelios (retired), Shawn Horcoff (Edmonton Oilers), Eric Lindros (retired) and Robyn Regehr (retired) to form a search committee for a new executive director. With the assistance of Reilly Partners, an executive search firm from Chicago, the search committee would review the resumes of hundreds of candidates.

The committee would ultimately recommend that Paul V. Kelly, a founding partner of Kelly, Libby and Hoopes law firm in Boston, become the fourth executive director since the NHLPA's inception in 1967. Through a secret ballot system, the Player Representatives voted in favour of the committee's recommendation, and Kelly would be introduced at a media conference on October 24, 2007.

On December 7, 2007, the NHLPA and the David Suzuki Foundation decided to create a pact, led by Boston Bruins defenceman Andrew Ference, which had over 500 NHL players signed up to donate $290 annually to purchase carbon credits in order to offset their regular season travel.

On August 31, 2009, Paul Kelly was fired from the NHLPA.

On October 30, 2009, interim Executive Director Ian Penny resigned.

Donald Fehr era (2010–present) 

Following Ian Penny's resignation, the NHLPA was without a strong leader.  In late August 2010, it was widely speculated that former Major League Baseball Players Association Executive Director Donald Fehr would be appointed to this position.  However, a day after the speculation reached a climax on August 26, both NHLPA interim director Mike Ouellet and deputy commissioner and chief legal officer of the NHL Bill Daly disputed the claims that it is all hearsay, and nothing is concrete between the NHLPA and Donald Fehr. However, Fehr would be formally named as executive director later in 2010.

On January 6, 2012, the NHLPA rejected a proposal for realignment in the league for beginning in the 2012–13 season, which impacted CBA discussions.

On September 15, 2012, with no agreement being reached on a new CBA, the owners locked out the players, thus threatening the start of the 2012–13 NHL season. Three months later, on December 14, the NHL filed a class action suit with the U.S. District Court in New York seeking to establish that the lockout was legal. They also filed an unfair labor practice charge with the U.S. National Labor Relations Board, saying that the union had been negotiating in bad faith and that their threat to disclaim interest is a negotiating ploy that violates the collective bargaining process. On December 21, a person told the Associated Press that a vote was cast to give the NHLPA executive board a chance to file a disclaimer of interest, with the vote in favor 706–22. The board had until January 2, 2013, to file the disclaimer, in which then the union would have dissolved and became a trade organization, which would have allowed players to file antitrust lawsuits against the NHL.

On January 6, the NHLPA reached a tentative agreement with the NHL to end the lockout. The NHLPA then approved a league proposal for realignment in the league beginning in the 2013–14 season.

Organization 
While the management of daily operations is the responsibility of the NHLPA Executive Director, the ultimate control over all NHLPA activities resides with the players, who each year elect representatives in order to form an executive board. Each of the 32 teams has one representative on the board.

Executive Directors 
 Alan Eagleson, 1967–91
 vacant, 1991–92
 Bob Goodenow, 1992–2005
 Ted Saskin, 2005–07
 Paul Kelly, 2007 – August 31, 2009
 Ian Penny (interim), August 31, 2009 – October 30, 2009
 Mike Ouellet (interim), October 30, 2009 – December 18, 2010
 Donald Fehr, December 18, 2010 – February 16, 2023
 Marty Walsh, February 16, 2023 – present

Presidents 
 Ted Lindsay (1957–1958)
 Bob Pulford (1967–1972)
 Ken Dryden (1972–1974)
 Pit Martin (1974–1975)
 Bobby Clarke (1975–1979)
 Phil Esposito (1979 – February 10, 1981)
 Tony Esposito (February 10, 1981 – October 24, 1984)
 Bryan Trottier (October 24, 1984 – November 9, 1992)
 Doug Wilson (November 9, 1992 – September 13, 1993)
 Mike Gartner (September 13, 1993 – 1998)
 Trevor Linden (1998–2006)

Executive Board members 
The following is the list of NHLPA Executive Board members from each team for the 2021–22 NHL season.

Ted Lindsay Award

See also

Related
 Hockey Fights Cancer
 Professional Hockey Players' Association

Similar organizations
Major League Baseball Players Association
National Basketball Players Association
MLS Players Association

References

External links 
 
 National Hockey League

1967 establishments in Ontario
Players Association
Sports trade unions
Sports trade unions of the United States
Trade unions established in 1967
Trade unions in Canada